MFA may refer to:

Organizations
 Marine and Fisheries Agency, a former UK government executive agency
 Ministry of Foreign Affairs (including a list of ministries with the name)
 Movement of the Forces of the Future, a political party in Côte d'Ivoire
 Armed Forces Movement, the group responsible for Portugal's Carnation Revolution in 1974

Education
 Master of Fine Arts

Football
 Mumbai Football Association
 Malta Football Association
 Mauritius Football Association
 Midland Football Alliance, England 
 Montserrat Football Association
 Munster Football Association, Ireland

United States
 Math for America
 Mercy for Animals
 MFA Oil, an energy cooperative
 Missouri Farmers Association
 Museum of Fine Arts, Boston, Massachusetts
 Museum of Fine Arts (St. Petersburg, Florida)

Science and technology
 Made for AdSense, a pejorative description for some websites
 Mail filtering agent
 Material flow accounting
 Material flow analysis
 Medium-functioning autism, a classification of autism
 Metabolic flux analysis
 Methylfluoroalkoxy, a perfluoro polymer
 Multi-factor authentication, a means of confirming user identity

Transport
 Mafia Airport (IATA airport code), Tanzania
 Morfa Mawddach railway station (National Rail station code), Gwynedd, Wales

Other uses
 M.F.A. (film) a 2017 film
 Multi Fibre Arrangement, a former system of textile export quotas
Medicare for All, a U.S. political movement for single-payer healthcare

See also
 Anthony Mfa Mezui (born 1991), a Gabonese association football player